Antelientomon is a genus of hexapods in the order Protura, and the only genus in the family Antelientomidae. It contains three species.

 Antelientomon guilinicum Zhang & Yin, 1981
 Antelientomon prodromi Yin, 1974
 Antelientomon xizangnicum Yin, 1990

References

Protura